Deutsch-Asiatische Bank (DAB) was a foreign bank in China. Its principal activity was trade financing, but together with English and French banks, it also played a role in the underwriting of bonds for the Chinese government and in the financing of railway construction in China.

History 
Deutsche-Asiatische Bank was founded in Shanghai on 12 February 1889 with the participation of Deutsche Bank, one of the largest banks in Germany. At the time, it was the first large non-British bank to enter the Chinese market. It set up branches in Calcutta (1895), Tianjin (1890), Hankou (1897), Qingdao (1897), Hong Kong (1900), Yokohama (1905), Kobe (1906), Singapore (1906), Beijing (1910), Guangzhou (1910) and Jinan (1914). Until World War I, it developed a cooperative relationship with the Hong Kong and Shanghai Banking Corporation against encroachments by competing foreign banks from France, Japan and Russia.

In 1906, the bank received the concession to issue its own banknotes in China. Its branch in Qingdao was plundered by the victorious Japanese army following the siege of Tsingtao in 1914, and was subsequently used to host the Japanese Consulate until World War II. The rest of its Chinese network was closed in 1917 by the Chinese government, partly reconstituted in the interwar period, and terminated again during World War II. In 1953, it launched a new beginning in Hamburg. Together with partner banks within the EBIC group, Deutsche Bank subsequently founded "Europäisch-Asiatische Bank" in 1972 (later renamed "European Asian Bank"), which the former Deutsch-Asiatische Bank was merged into. In 1986, the bank was called "Deutsche Bank (Asia)" after the partner banks withdrew from their participations. Between 1987 and 1988, it was then merged into Deutsche Bank.

Branch buildings in China

After World War I, the property was taken over by China's Bank of Communications, which in the 1940s replaced it with the still-standing Bank of Communications Building.

Banknotes

Like other foreign banks in China at the time, the Deutsch-Asiatische Bank issued paper currency in the concessions where it had established branch offices.

See also
 Banque de l'Indochine
 Yokohama Specie Bank
 Russo-Chinese Bank
 Banque Industrielle de Chine

References

Defunct banks of China
Defunct banks of Hong Kong
Banks based in Shanghai
Banks disestablished in 1972
Banks established in 1889
Chinese companies established in 1889
Deutsche Bank